Loricifera (from Latin, lorica, corselet (armour) + ferre, to bear) is a phylum of very small to microscopic marine cycloneuralian sediment-dwelling animals with 43 described species. and approximately 100 more that have been collected and not yet described. Their sizes range from 100 μm to ca. 1 mm.

They are characterised by a protective outer case called a lorica and their habitat is in the spaces between marine gravel to which they attach themselves. The phylum was discovered in 1983 by R.M. Kristensen, near Roscoff, France. They are among the most recently discovered groups of animals. They attach themselves quite firmly to the substrate, and hence remained undiscovered for so long. The first specimen was collected in the 1970s, and described in 1983. They are found at all depths, in different sediment types, and in all latitudes.

Morphology
The animals have a head, mouth, and digestive system, as well as the lorica. The head (which contains the mouth and the brain), a trunk region surrounded by six plates that make up the 'lorica' or corselet and – in between these two – the neck region. Loricifera have a well developed brain and each scalid is individually connected to the brain by nerves.
The armor-like lorica consists of a protective external shell or case of encircling plicae. There is no circulatory system and no endocrine system. Many of the larvae are acoelomate, with some adults being pseudocoelomate, and some remaining acoelomate. Development is generally direct, though there are so-called Higgins larvae, which differ from adults in several respects. As adults, the animals are gonochoric. Very complex and plastic life cycles of pliciloricids include also paedogenetic stages with different forms of parthenogenetic reproduction. Fossils have been dated to the late Cambrian.

Taxonomic affinity

Morphological studies have traditionally placed the phylum in the vinctiplicata with the Priapulida; this plus the Kinorhyncha constitutes the taxon Scalidophora. The three phyla share four characters in common – chitinous cuticle, rings of scalids on the introvert, flosculi, and two rings of introvert retracts. However, despite a 2015 study showing the phylum's closest relatives being the Panarthropoda, a 2022 study again showed that it belonged to the Scalidophora and told that further, more comprehensive genetic tests will be required to find its actual position in Ecdysozoa.

Evolutionary history
The loriciferans are believed to be miniaturized descendants of a larger organism, perhaps resembling the Cambrian fossil Sirilorica. However, the fossil record of the microscopic non-mineralized group is (perhaps unsurprisingly) scarce, so it is difficult to trace out the evolutionary history of the phylum in any detail.

The 2017 discovery of Cambrian Period Eolorica deadwoodensis may shed some light on the group's history.

In anoxic environments
Three species of Loricifera have been found in the oxygen-free sediments at the bottom of the L'Atalante basin in Mediterranean Sea, more than 3,000 meters down, the first multicellular organisms known to spend their entire lives in an anoxic environment. Initially, it was thought that they are able to do this because their mitochondria act like hydrogenosomes, allowing them to respire anaerobically. However, by 2021, questions arose as to whether or not they have mitochondria.

The newly reported animals complete their life cycle in the total absence of light and oxygen, and they are less than a millimetre in size. They were collected from a deep basin at the bottom of the Mediterranean Sea, where they inhabit a nearly salt-saturated brine that, because of its density (> 1.2 g/cm³), does not mix with the waters above. As a consequence, this environment is completely anoxic and, due to the activity of sulfate reducers, contains sulphide at a concentration of 2.9 mM. Despite such harsh conditions, this anoxic and sulphidic environment is teeming with microbial life, both chemosynthetic prokaryotes that are primary producers, and a broad diversity of eukaryotic heterotrophs at the next trophic level.

Taxa

References

Further reading

 

 

 
Animal phyla
Extant Cambrian first appearances